Hareoen Island is an uninhabited island of Baffin Bay, Greenland.

Geography
The island has an area of 125.9 km ² and has a shoreline of 44.3 kilometres.

See also
List of islands of Greenland

References

Uninhabited islands of Greenland